Gordonia westfalica is a rubber-degrading actinomycete bacterium. It is aerobic and Gram-positive, with type strain Kb2T (=DSM 44215T NRRL B-24152T).

References

Further reading

External links

LPSN
Type strain of Gordonia westfalica at BacDive -  the Bacterial Diversity Metadatabase

Mycobacteriales
Bacteria described in 2002